Perai is an urban settlement in the city of Seberang Perai, Penang, Malaysia. It lies at the southern bank of the Perai River and borders Butterworth to the north. Perai gave its name to the city of Seberang Perai, the mainland half of the State of Penang.

The area now known as Perai was obtained by the British East India Company in 1800, with the Perai River serving as the boundary between the newly-acquired British territory and Kedah to the north. A nascent railway line was built between Perai and Perak in the 1890s, transforming Perai into a transit point for the export of tin. Perai became heavily industrialised in the late 20th century.

Today, Perai is home to an eponymous industrial estate, as well as the adjacent township of Seberang Jaya. The town is connected to Penang Island via the Penang Bridge and contains several facilities of the Port of Penang.

Etymology 
Perai, situated at the estuary of the Perai River, lent its name from the waterway. Upon the acquisition of the area by the British East India Company in 1800, the river was known in Thai as plai, which meant "the end", as it formed the border between British Province Wellesley and the Siamese vassal state of Kedah; the Perai River thus marked the southernmost limit of Siamese influence. British maps of the era referred to the southern banks of the Perai River as Prye.

History
The settlement of Perai was formed in the early 19th century, following the acquisition of the area by the British East India Company. In its early years, agriculture formed the mainstay of Perai's economy, with sugar plantations being established within the settlement.

Perai was developed into an entrepôt towards the end of the 19th century. At the height of a tin-mining boom in the Malay Peninsula, a nascent rail line was built between Perai and the neighbouring state of Perak in the 1890s. Perai then became a transportation hub, where tin imported from Perak was loaded onto vessels to be shipped to George Town.

The industrialisation of Perai only began in 1970, when the Penang Development Corporation (PDC) commenced the development of the Perai Industrial Estate and the nearby township of Seberang Jaya. In 1974, the Port of Penang was relocated from George Town to Seberang Perai. Cargo and container facilities were built in both Perai and neighbouring Butterworth, substantially boosting the economy of the area.

In 1985, the Penang Bridge which links Perai and Penang Island was completed. The bridge was the longest in Southeast Asia until 2014, upon the opening of the Second Penang Bridge further south.

Geography 

Perai lies at the estuary of the Perai River, which empties into the Penang Strait. The town is located at the river's southern bank, bordering the town of Butterworth to the north. The Perai Industrial Estate encompasses much of Perai's seafront between the Perai River and the Penang Bridge, whilst the township of Seberang Jaya is situated to the east of Perai proper.

Demographics 
According to the 2010 Census conducted by Malaysia's Department of Statistics, Perai had a population of 14,433. The proportions of Penang's three major ethnicities – the Chinese, Malays and Indians – were more balanced in Perai, with each ethnic community making up more than a quarter of the town's population.

Due to the heavier level of industrialisation within Perai, there has been an influx of foreign workers into the Central Seberang Perai District. , foreigners constituted more than 7% of Perai's population.

Economy 
The Perai Industrial Estate is home to numerous multinational and local firms. The major local companies within the area include Malayan Sugar, Ann Joo Resources, Southern Steel, Harvik Rubber and Soon Soon Oilmills. Notably, Malaysia's oldest steel mill and the country's largest sugar refinery, owned by Ann Joo Resources and Malayan Sugar respectively, are situated within the industrial estate.  The multinational companies within the area include Mattel, Pensonic, Hitachi, Mitsuoka, Chevron and Honeywell Aerospace.

Meanwhile, the Port of Penang, which operates two facilities within Perai, provides logistical connectivity to these heavy industries. Perai's industries are among the major contributors to the dry-bulk volume in the town's port facilities, which also handle shipments of coal and scrap metal.

Transportation

Land 

Jalan Perusahaan Perai is the main thoroughfare within the heart of Perai proper. The road is linked to the Prai River Bridge, which spans the width of the Perai River between Perai and Butterworth. Meanwhile the North–South Expressway runs through the neighbourhood of Seberang Jaya.

The Penang Bridge, opened in 1985, connects Perai with Gelugor on Penang Island.

Rapid Penang buses 701, 703, 709 and 801 serve the residents of Perai, connecting the town with Butterworth, Bukit Mertajam and Nibong Tebal. In addition, Rapid Penang operates Bridge Express Shuttle Transit (BEST) bus services towards Bayan Lepas on Penang Island, catering mainly to industrial workers, as well as an interstate bus service to the town of Sungai Petani in the neighbouring state of Kedah.

Sea 
The Port of Penang has two facilities within Perai, namely the Perai Bulk Cargo Terminal and the Perai Wharves.

Education 
Perai contains nine primary schools, five high schools, an international school and a private tertiary institution.

Primary schools

High schools

International school
 Chinese Taipei School Penang
Private college
 Open University Malaysia
In addition to these schools, Seberang Jaya is home to the Penang State Library, the main public library of the State of Penang.

Health care 
The Seberang Jaya Hospital, run by Malaysia's Ministry of Health, is one of the six public hospitals scattered throughout the State of Penang. Situated within the neighbourhood of Seberang Jaya, it also serves as the main hospital within the entire municipality of Seberang Perai. The 393-bed hospital offers various specialist treatments and procedures, including general surgery, nephrology and obstetrics. An ongoing upgrade of the hospital, scheduled for completion by 2021, is expected to increase its capacity by 316 beds.

Shopping 
Perai is home to some of the largest shopping malls within the entire Seberang Perai.

Within Perai proper, Megamal Pinang, built in the 1990s, is the main shopping mall. The mall contains four retail storeys, and is anchored by Mega Lanes and Mega Cineplex.

Sunway Carnival Mall at Seberang Jaya was opened in 2007 and is the flagship shopping centre of Sunway Group within the State of Penang. Its main anchor tenants are Parkson, Giant Hypermarket and Golden Screen Cinemas. The mall also contains the Sunway Carnival Convention Centre, one of the major venues in Seberang Perai for meetings, incentives, conferences and exhibitions (MICE).

In 2015, Mydin launched the Mydin Mall, its 20th wholesale hypermarket, at Jalan Baru. The mall is the largest Mydin outlet in Malaysia.

The mall will feature the first ice-skating rink in northern Malaysia, a 38-lane bowling alley and Golden Screen Cinemas' largest cineplex.

See also
 Butterworth
 Seberang Perai

References

Towns in Penang